This list is of the Places of Scenic Beauty of Japan located within the Prefecture of Tochigi.

National Places of Scenic Beauty
As of 1 January 2021, three Places have been designated at a national level.

Prefectural Places of Scenic Beauty
As of 1 May 2020, one Place has been designated at a prefectural level.

Municipal Places of Scenic Beauty
As of 1 May 2020, five Places have been designated at a municipal level.

Registered Places of Scenic Beauty
As of 1 January 2021, four Monuments have been registered (as opposed to designated) as Places of Scenic Beauty at a national level.

See also
 Cultural Properties of Japan
 List of parks and gardens of Tochigi Prefecture
 List of Historic Sites of Japan (Tochigi)

References

External links
  Cultural Properties in Tochigi Prefecture

Tourist attractions in Tochigi Prefecture
Places of Scenic Beauty